"The Loneliness of the Long-Distance Walker" is a missing episode in the British comedy series Dad's Army. It was originally transmitted on 15 March 1969. One of the three missing Dad's Army episodes, only a few short clips and screenshots survive in the archives.

Synopsis
To his complete surprise, Walker receives his call-up papers. Mainwaring tries his best to get the authorities to reconsider.

Plot
When Walker is called up, he applies to the Military Service Hardship Committee, which rejects him on the grounds that he does not keep books for his business. After Jones's attempts to sabotage his medical test fail, Walker is invalided out because he is allergic to corned beef.

Cast

Arthur Lowe as Captain Mainwaring
John Le Mesurier as Sergeant Wilson
Clive Dunn as Lance Corporal Jones
John Laurie as Private Frazer
James Beck as Private Walker
Arnold Ridley as Private Godfrey
Ian Lavender as Private Pike
Anthony Sharp as Brigadier (War Office)
Diana King as Chairwoman
Patrick Waddington as Brigadier
Edward Evans as Mr Rees
Michael Knowles as Captain Cutts
Gilda Perry as Blonde
Larry Martyn as Soldier
Robert Lankesheer as Medical Officer
Colin Bean as Private Sponge

Remake

Kevin McNally as Captain Mainwaring
Robert Bathurst as Sergeant Wilson
Kevin Eldon as Lance Corporal Jones
David Hayman as Private Frazer
Mathew Horne as Private Walker
Timothy West as Private Godfrey
Tom Rosenthal as Private Pike
Christopher Villiers as Brigadier (War Office)
Sam Phillips as Captain Cutts
Julia Deakin as the Chairwoman
Andrew Havill as the Brigadier
Jerry-Jane Pears as Judy
Gareth Benjamin as Mr Rees
Lee Barnett as the soldier

Notes
This episode was originally planned for transmission on 20 January 1969.
This is one of the three missing Dad's Army episodes, after the tape was wiped by the BBC for reuse. The other two are A Stripe for Frazer and Under Fire.
UKTV Gold commissioned recreations of all three missing episodes. The remake of this episode was first broadcast on 25 August 2019.
In the remade episode, two cast members have a link to David Croft, Julia Deakin was in Oh Doctor Beeching! and Andrew Havill was in the 2016 film of Dad's Army.

Further reading

External links

    

Dad's Army radio episodes
Dad's Army missing episodes
Dad's Army (series 2) episodes
1969 British television episodes